The six regions of Eritrea are divided into administrative subregions.

Anseba Region 
 Adi Tekelezan
 Asmat
 Hamelmalo
 Elabered
Geleb
Hagaz
 Halhal
 Habero
Keren
 Kerkebet
Sela

Central (Maekel) Region 
Berikh
 Ghala Nefhi
 North Eastern
 North western
 Serejaka
 South Eastern
 South Western

Gash-Barka Region 
Akurdet
Barentu
Dghe
Forto
Gogne
Omhajer
Haykota
 Logo Anseba
Mensura
Mogolo
Molki
Shambuko
Teseney
 Upper Gash

Northern Red Sea Region 
 Afabet
 Adobha
Dahlak
 Ghela'elo
Foro
 Ghinda
 Karura
 Massawa
Nakfa
She'eb

Southern (Debub) Region 
Mai ani
 Tsorona
 Emni Haili
Adi Keyh
Adi Quala
Areza
Debarwa
Dekemhare
Mai-Mne
Mendefera
Segeneiti
Senafe

Southern Red Sea Region 
 Are'eta
  Assab
 Central Denkalya
 Southern Denkalya

References

 
Eritrea, Districts of
Subregions, Eritrea
Subregions